X-42 is the designation of a still-classified U.S. military space project. Specifications or photos of the program have not been released to the public; as a result not much is known about its goals. It is believed to be a liquid-fueled rocket upper stage capable of boosting a payload of up to 4,000 lb (1,800 kg) into Earth orbit.

External links
X-42, globalsecurity.org

Space launch vehicles of the United States